Banana is a settlement in the central part of the island of Santiago, Cape Verde. It is situated 3 km northeast of São Domingos.

References

Villages and settlements in Santiago, Cape Verde
São Domingos Municipality, Cape Verde